is a Japanese professional golfer.

Shinozaki plays on the Japan Golf Tour, where he has won once.

Professional wins (5)

Japan Golf Tour wins (1)

Japan Golf Tour playoff record (1–0)

Japan PGA Senior Tour wins (4)
2020 Maruhancup Taiheiyo Club Senior
2021 Nojima Championcup Hakone Senior Progolf Tournament, ISPS Handa Great Ni Tanoshiku Omoshiroi Senior Tournament, Fukuoka Senior Open Golf Tournament

External links

Japanese male golfers
Japan Golf Tour golfers
Sportspeople from Chiba Prefecture
1969 births
Living people